Adapinae is a subfamily within the extinct primate family Adapidae primarily found in Europe until the end of the Eocene. They are thought to have originated in Asia.

References

Literature cited

External links
Mikko's Phylogeny Archive

Prehistoric strepsirrhines
Eocene first appearances
Eocene extinctions
Fossil taxa described in 1879